Friederike Auguste Sophie of Anhalt-Bernburg (28 August 1744, Bernburg – 12 April 1827, Coswig), was a princess consort of Anhalt-Zerbst. She was married to Frederick Augustus, Prince of Anhalt-Zerbst, and sister-in-law to the Russian Empress Catherine the Great. She was the regent governor of Jever from April 1793, until October 1806.

Biography 

She was the daughter of Victor Frederick, Prince of Anhalt-Bernburg, and Princess Albertine of Brandenburg-Schwedt (1712–1750), and married Frederick Augustus, Prince of Anhalt-Zerbst, 22 May 1764 at Ballenstedt am Harz. Due to a conflict with Prussia, Frederick Augustus had been living in exile since 1758, and the couple settled in Basel in 1765. She was in contact with Isaak Iselin and Peter Ochs and was dedicated the book "Geschichte der Stadt und Landschaft Basel" (1786). In 1780–1791, she lived apart from her spouse, who moved to Luxemburg.

In 1793, her husband died childless, and his territories were divided among his relatives. The area of Jever, which allowed for female succession, was inherited by his sister in law Catherine the Great. Friederike was appointed regent-governor in Jever on Catherine's behalf in April 1793. She is described as an active regent who introduced many reforms. She was forced to resign when Jever was taken by France under Napoleon in October 1806.

She spent her remaining life with her sister Christine Elisabeth Albertine, Princess of Schwarzburg-Sondershausen (1746 - 1823) at Coswig Castle.

References 
 Fissen, Karl: Das alte Jever. Jever 1981.
 Ders.: 1000 Jahre Jever, 400 Jahre Stadt. Teil 2. Jever 1936.
 Jenny, Hans A.: Basler Anekdoten. Basel 1990.
 Meier, Eugen A.: Freud und Leid (2. Band). Basel 1983.
 Schmidt, Johann Heinrich: Trauerrede am Sarge der weiland Durchlauchtigsten verwittw. Frau Fürstin von Anhalt-Zerbst, geb. Fürstin von Anhalt-Bernburg. Wittenberg 1827.
 Werner, Ernst: Geschichte der Stadt Coswig/Anhalt. Coswig 1929.
 Ysker, Kriemhild: Das Leben der Fürstin Friederike Auguste Sophie von Anhalt-Zerbst, geborene Prinzessin von Anhalt-Bernburg (1744-1827). In: Der Historien-Kalender auf das Jahr 1996 (159/1995), S. 52–69.

18th-century women rulers
1744 births
1827 deaths
18th-century German people
19th-century women rulers
18th-century German politicians
18th-century German women
19th-century German women
Princesses of Anhalt-Zerbst
Daughters of monarchs